Artus is a name.

Artus or Arthus may also refer to:

 Artus Court, a building in Gdańsk, Poland
 Artus de Lionne (1655–1713), bishop and French missionary
 Artus Prime, a fictional planet in the Star Wars franchise
 Artus, a 2019 album by German band Schandmaul
 K11 ARTUS, a residential area in Victoria Dockside, Hong Kong

See also
 Arthus (disambiguation)